The Limits of Liberty: American History 1607-1980 is a book by historian Maldwyn Jones, first published in 1983 in the Short Oxford History of the Modern World series.

It covers 373 years of American history and is the most comprehensive single-authored book on this topic, taking nearly 20 years for the author to complete.

Contents
The book contains 28 chapters, as well as an extensive bibliography, 15 pages of historical maps, population tables, details of presidential elections and a list of justices of the Supreme Court.

Chapters
 Colonial Foundations, 1607–1760
 Provincial Expansion, 1700–1763
 Revolution and Independence, 1763–1783
 The Revolutionary Transformation, 1776–1789
 The Federalist Age, 1789–1801
 Jeffersonian Republicanism, 1801–1824
 The Expanding Union, 1815–1860
 The Politics of Egalitarianism, 1824–1844
 Social and Cultural Ferment, 1820–1860
 Westward Expansion and Sectional Conflict, 1844–1850
 The Road to Secession, 1850–1861
 The Civil War, 1861–1865
 Reconstruction, 1865–1877
 The New South and the Negro, 1877–1914
 Taming the West, 1865–1900
 The Growth of an Industrial Economy, 1865–1914
 Society and Culture in the Industrial Era, 1860–1910
 Politics from Conservatism to Revolt, 1877–1896
 The Progressive Era, 1900–1917
 The United States and World Affairs, 1865–1914
 The United States and the First World War, 1914–1920
 After the War, 1919–1929
 The Great Depression 1929-1939
 Foreign Policy between the Wars, 1921–1941
 Global War, 1941–1945
 Cold War Tensions, 1945–1960
 The Troubled Years, 1960–1980
 American Society and Culture, 1940–1980

References

1983 non-fiction books
History books about the United States